(born December 30, 1992 in Tokyo) is a professional Japanese kickboxer. She won the 2011 Shoot Boxing Girls S-Cup tournament. She is also the former Rise Queen champion, WBC World Women's Mini Flyweight champion, WPMF World Women's Mini Flyweight champion, and is a former J-GIRLS Mini Flyweight champion.

Kickboxing career
Having started karate while she was in junior high school, she started kickboxing in 2006 when she went to Yamato Dojo with her father.  On February 4, 2007, Kamimura made her amateur debut and won by knockout.  On March 31, 2007, Kamimura beat the younger Madoka Jinnai by unanimous decision.

On February 11, 2008, Kamimura made her professional debut against Mika, winning by decision at the age of 15. On April 13, 2008, Kamimura was named the MVP of the J-Grow 20 Amateur Tournament with her victory over Madoka Jinnai. An initial match between Kamimura and Ai Takahashi was canceled after Takahashi injured her zygomatic bone in training. As a result, Kamimura was entered into the 2011 Shoot Boxing Girls S-Cup. Having defeated the 2009 and 2010 champion, Rena Kubota, in an exhibition match, Kamimura was a heavy favorite going in. Kamimura won the tournament, finishing her first two opponents and defeating Seo Hee Ham in the final match by decision. Rena Kubota, who fought on the same event but not in the tournament, announced at the event that she would be fighting Kamimura for the first ever Rise Queen title.

Rena defeated Kamimura by decision to win the Rise Queen title at Rise 85. The fight would have been ruled a draw but deducted points gave the match to Rena. At Rise 87, Kamimura defeated Yau-en Fan in 33 seconds by knockout.  Kamimura faced Seo Hee Ham in a rematch at Rise 88 on June 2, 2012. She defeated Ham by unanimous decision. With the victory, plans are being made for a rematch with Rena.

Kamimura entered the 2012 Shoot Boxing Girls S-Cup on August 25, 2012. She was defeated by Lorena Klijn via unanimous decision in the opening round of the tournament.  She next faced Lomar Lookboonmee for the vacant WPMF World Women's Mini Flyweight (-47.7 kg/105 lb) Championship at RISE/M-1 ~Infinity~ in Tokyo on December 2, 2012. Kamimura defeated Lookboonmee by knockout in the third round.  

Kamimura retained her WPMF title by defeating Churi Gothawynjim at M-FIGHT SUK WEERASAKRECK II Part.1 on June 16, 2013.  Kamimura then faced off against J-Girls champion Momi for the vacant Rise Queen title at Rise 95 on September 13, 2013. She defeated Momi by unanimous decision to become the new Rise Queen champion.

In August, 2014 Kamimura retired from competition citing an unspecified incurable condition that was aggravated by the physical and mental stress of fighting. She maintains a normal life and continues to teach martial arts.

Championships and accomplishments

Titles
 2009 J-Girls Mini Flyweight champion
 2009 WPMF World Women's Mini Flyweight champion
 2010 WMC World Women's Mini Flyweight champion
 2011 WBC World Women's Mini Flyweight champion
 2011 Shoot Boxing Girls S-Cup winner
 2012 WPMF World Women's Mini Flyweight champion
 2013 Rise Queen champion

Awards
eFight.jp
Fighter of the Month (August 2011)

Kickboxing and shoot boxing record

|-  bgcolor="#CCFFCC"
| 2013-09-13 || Win ||align=left| Momi || Rise 95 || Decision (Unanimous) || 5 || 3:00 || 28-3
|-
! style=background:white colspan=9 |
|-  bgcolor="#CCFFCC"
| 2013-06-16 || Win ||align=left| Churi Gothawynjim || M-FIGHT SUK WEERASAKRECK II Part.1 || TKO (Punches) || 1 || 1:44 || 27-3
|-
! style=background:white colspan=9 |
|-  bgcolor="#CCFFCC"
| 2012-12-02 || Win ||align=left| Loma Lookboonmee || RISE/M-1 ~Infinity~ || KO (Right Straight) || 3 || 1:21 || 26-3
|-
! style=background:white colspan=9 |
|-  bgcolor="FFBBBB"
| 2012-08-25 || Loss ||align=left| Lorena Klijn || 2012 Shoot Boxing Girls S-Cup, Quarterfinal || Decision (Unanimous) || 4 (Ex.1) || 2:00 || 25-3
|-  bgcolor="#CCFFCC"
| 2012-06-02 || Win ||align=left| Seo Hee Ham || Rise 88 || Decision (Unanimous) || 3 || 3:00 || 25-2
|-  bgcolor="#CCFFCC"
| 2012-03-24 || Win ||align=left| Yau~en Fan || Rise 87 || KO (Left Straight) || 1 || 0:33 || 24-2
|-  bgcolor="#FFBBBB"
| 2011-11-23 || Loss ||align=left| Rena Kubota || Rise 85 - Rise Heavyweight Tournament 2011 || Decision (Unanimous) || 5 || 3:00 || 23-2
|-
! style=background:white colspan=9 |
|-  bgcolor="#CCFFCC"
| 2011-10-02 || Win ||align=left| Denise Castle|| WBC Muay Thai Japan - The Path to the World Champion || KO (Left Hook) || 1 || 1:49 || 23-1
|-
! style=background:white colspan=9 |
|-  bgcolor="CCFFCC"
| 2011-08-19 || Win ||align=left| Seo Hee Ham || 2011 Shoot Boxing Girls S-Cup, Final || Decision (Unanimous) || 3 || 2:00 || 22-1
|-
! style=background:white colspan=9 |
|-  bgcolor="CCFFCC"
| 2011-08-19 || Win ||align=left| Miyo Yoshida || 2011 Shoot Boxing Girls S-Cup, Semi-Final || TKO (2 Knockdowns, Left Hook) || 1 || 0:50 || 21-1
|-  bgcolor="CCFFCC"
| 2011-08-19 || Win ||align=left| Kanako Oka || 2011 Shoot Boxing Girls S-Cup, Quarterfinal || TKO (Punches) || 2 || 0:31 || 20-1
|-  bgcolor="#CCFFCC"
| 2011-07-23 || Win ||align=left| Titiana van Polanen || Rise 80 || TKO (3 Knockdowns, Left Hook) || 1 || 2:01 || 19-1
|-  bgcolor="#CCFFCC"
| 2011-06-04 || Win ||align=left| Silvia La Notte || Rise 78|| TKO (Doctor Stoppage) || 3 || 1:20 || 18-1
|-  bgcolor="#CCFFCC"
| 2011-04-17 || Win ||align=left| Tawan Por. Pramuk || Rise 76 || KO (Left Hook) || 1 || 0:21 || 17-1
|-  bgcolor="#CCFFCC"
| 2010-12-30 || Win ||align=left| Chiharu || Sengoku Soul of Fight || TKO (Doctor Stoppage, Cut) || 2 || 0:38 || 16-1
|-  bgcolor="#CCFFCC"
| 2010-11-14 || Win ||align=left| Namuwan Shiddjanchai || M-1 FAIRTEX SINGHA BEER Muay Thai Challenge || KO (Right Hook to the Body)|| 1 || 1:48 || 15-1
|-
! style=background:white colspan=9 |
|-  bgcolor="#CCFFCC"
| 2010-09-12 || Win ||align=left| Nongnuen Soshiriwan || M-1 FAIRTEX SINGHA BEER Muay Thai Challenge || Decision (Unanimous) || 5 || 2:00 || 14-1
|-
! style=background:white colspan=9 |
|-  bgcolor="#CCFFCC"
| 2010-07-25 || Win ||align=left| Motoe Abe || J-NETWORK - J-GIRLS Catch The Stone 9 || Decision (Unanimous) || 5 || 2:00 || 13-1
|-
! style=background:white colspan=9 |
|-  bgcolor="#CCFFCC"
| 2010-05-16 || Win ||align=left| Ho Seongbok || Rise 65 || KO (Left Straight) || 1 || 0:58 || 12-1
|-  bgcolor="#CCFFCC"
| 2010-03-21 || Win ||align=left| Tonta || M-1 FAIRTEX SINGHA BEER Muay Thai Challenge ||Decision (Unanimous) || 3 || 3:00 || 11-1
|-  bgcolor="#FFBBBB"
| 2009-12-20 || Loss ||align=left| Motoe Abe || J-NETWORK - J-GIRLS Final Stage 2009 || Decision (Unanimous) || 2 || 2:00 || 10-1
|-  bgcolor="#CCFFCC"
| 2009-12-20 || Win ||align=left| Neshian Por. Pramuk || J-NETWORK - J-GIRLS Final Stage 2009|| Decision (Unanimous) || 2 || 2:00 || 10-0
|-  bgcolor="#CCFFCC"
| 2009-09-13 || Win ||align=left| Payakuin Shitoniwato || M-1 FAIRTEX SINGHA BEER Muay Thai Challenge 2009 Yod Nak Suu vol.3|| Decision (Unanimous) || 3 || 2:00 || 9-0
|-
! style=background:white colspan=9 |
|-  bgcolor="#CCFFCC"
| 2009-07-26 || Win ||align=left| Haru Tajima ||J-NETWORK - J-GIRLS Champion Festival 2009|| Decision (Unanimous) || 5 || 2:00 || 8-0
|-
! style=background:white colspan=9 |
|-  bgcolor="#CCFFCC"
| 2009-04-05 || Win ||align=left| Little Tiger || J-NETWORK - J-GIRLS Catch The Stone 2 || Decision (Unanimous) || 3 || 2:00 || 7-0
|-  bgcolor="#CCFFCC"
| 2009-01-18 || Win ||align=left| Shyoko Hayashida || J-NETWORK - J-GIRLS Catch The Stone 1 || Decision (Unanimous) || 3 || 2:00 || 6-0
|-  bgcolor="CCFFCC"
| 2008-11-09 || Win ||align=left| Mai || J-NETWORK - J-GIRLS Final Stage 2008 || KO (Right High Kick) || 2 || 1:40 || 5-0
|-  bgcolor="#CCFFCC"
| 2008-09-07 || Win ||align=left| Miho || J-NETWORK - J-GIRLS Hurricane Battle || TKO (3 Knockdowns, Right Middle Kick) || 2 || 1:41 || 4-0
|-  bgcolor="#CCFFCC"
| 2008-07-21 || Win ||align=left| Tomoko Kuramitsu || J-NETWORK - J-GIRLS Summer Kick Carnival || Decision (Unanimous) || 3 || 2:00 || 3-0
|-  bgcolor="#CCFFCC"
| 2008-05-25 || Win ||align=left| Yukiko Seki || J-NETWORK - J-GIRLS Ayame Festival|| TKO (3 Knockdowns, Right Middle Kick) || 3 || 1:38 || 2-0
|-  bgcolor="#CCFFCC"
| 2008-02-11 || Win ||align=left| Mika || MARS 11 "2nd ANNIVERSARY" ||Decision (Unanimous) || 3 || 2:00 || 1-0
|-
| colspan=9 | Legend:

Amateur Kickboxing record

|-  bgcolor="#CCFFCC"
| 2008-04-13 || Win ||align=left| Madoka Jinnai || J-NETWORK - J-GROW 20 Amateur Tournament|| Decision (Unanimous) || 2 || 1:00 || 5-1-1
|-  bgcolor="#FFBBBB"
| 2007-11-04 || Loss ||align=left| Madoka Jinnai || J-NETWORK - J-GIRLS Kazabana Festival|| Decision (Unanimous) || 3 (Ex.1) || 1:30 || 4-1-1
|-  bgcolor="#CCFFCC"
| 2007-11-04 || Win ||align=left| Suzuna Nakamura || J-NETWORK - J-GIRLS Kazabana Festival|| KO || 2 || 0:21 || 4-0-1
|-  bgcolor="#c5d2ea"
| 2007-05-20 || Draw ||align=left| Saki Yamada || J-NETWORK - J-GIRLS Women's Festival Final round|| Draw (Unanimous) || 2 || 1:30 || 3-0-1
|-  bgcolor="#CCFFCC"
| 2007-04-15 || Win ||align=left| Madoka Jinnai || Tenku Kickboxing Association|| KO || 2 || 0:54 || 3-0
|-  bgcolor="#CCFFCC"
| 2007-03-31 || Win ||align=left| Madoka Jinnai || J-NETWORK - J-GIRLS Women's Festival 2nd Round|| Decision (Unanimous) || 2 || 1:30 || 2-0
|-  bgcolor="#CCFFCC"
| 2007-02-04 || Win ||align=left| Itsuki Okamoto || J-NETWORK - J-GIRLS Women's Festival Opener|| KO (Left Middle Kick) || 1 || 0:20 || 1-0
|-
| colspan=9 | Legend:

References

External links
Shoot boxing profile 
J-Girls profile 
Target Gym profile 
Official Blog (old) 
Sengoku profile 
Official Blog 

1992 births
Living people
Japanese female kickboxers
People from Tokyo